Patrik Sandell (born April 21, 1982) is a rally driver from Sweden. Sandell won the Swedish Junior Championship in 2004 and the Swedish Group N3 Championship in 2005. In 2006, he won the Junior World Rally Championship (JWRC) title driving for Renault. In 2008, Sandell contested both the JWRC and the Production World Rally Championship (PWRC).

Sandell joined Olsbergs MSE to drive a Ford Fiesta at the Global RallyCross Championship in 2013. He finished 6th in the standings, scoring two podiums. In 2014 he won a race and finished in the overall championship in 6th place. He joined Bryan Herta Rallysport in 2015, driving with sponsorship from Kobalt Tools.

Biography

Sandell’s interest in motorsport came as a teenager. He was 16 when he first tried rallycross, and 17 when he ran his first rally. Sandell won his first championship in 2004 when he won the Swedish Junior Championship, and won the Swedish Group N3 title in 2005.

In 2006, Sandell contested the Junior World Rally Championship and won the title with a win and three podiums in six starts. Over the next few years, he would continue racing in the JWRC, Production World Rally Championship, and Super 2000 World Rally Championship, earning victories in all three classes. Sandell became a Red Bull athlete in 2009 and won his first two PWRC starts that year in Norway and Cyprus.

In 2012, Sandell made his debut with the Mini WRC Team at his native 2012 Rally Sweden and finished a career-best eighth. Mini parent BMW later terminated its contract with Prodrive, and Sandell no longer raced in WRC after the 2012 season.

For 2013, Sandell moved to the Global RallyCross Championship and joined Olsbergs MSE. He earned his first podium in his first GRC start at X Games Brazil, and finished the year sixth in points. He replicated that result in 2014, also earning his first career win in a race at RFK Stadium that June.

In 2015, Sandell switched to the new Bryan Herta Rallysport team. Sandell would spend the 2015 and 2016 seasons with the team, winning once each year.

Sandell accepted a new drive with Subaru Rally Team USA for 2017 and finished eighth in points. He earned his first podium of the season in the first Atlantic City round. In 2018, Sandell continued to compete for the team in the newly established Americas Rallycross series, where he finished third in points. Sandell also returned to stage rally for three American Rally Association events in 2018, winning all three.

Sandell will continue to compete in Americas Rallycross for the newly rebranded Subaru Motorsports team in 2019.

Racing record

Complete WRC results
(key)

JWRC results

Complete PWRC results

Complete SWRC results

IRC results

Complete FIA European Rallycross Championship results
(key)

Supercar

Complete Global Rallycross Championship results
(key)

Supercar

RallyX on Ice
(key)

References

External links
patriksandell.com

1982 births
Living people
European Rallycross Championship drivers
World Rally Championship drivers
Swedish rally drivers
Intercontinental Rally Challenge drivers
Global RallyCross Championship drivers
X Games athletes
Bryan Herta Autosport drivers
Škoda Motorsport drivers